Tibbetts is an English-language patronymic surname from the given names Tebald or Tibalt. Notable people with the name include:

 Billy Tibbetts (born 1974), ice hockey player
 George W. Tibbetts (1845–1924), American merchant and farmer; critic of violence against Chinese workers
 John C. Tibbetts (born 1946), film critic, historian, and pianist
 Kurt Tibbetts (born 1954), politician
 Mollie Tibbetts (1998–2018), American murder victim
 Steve Tibbetts (born 1954), guitarist and composer
 Tammy Tibbetts, (born  1985), American women's rights activist
 Willard Tibbetts (1903–1992), runner

See also 
 
 Tibbets

References 

English-language surnames
Patronymic surnames